Robert Ng'ambi (born 11 September 1986) is a Malawian retired footballer who played most of his career for South African clubs Black Leopards and Platinum Stars. Playing at the midfielder position he earned 66 caps with the Malawi national team.

He announced his retirement in October 2020, deciding not to renew his contract with Black Leopards to allow more playing time for the youngsters.

International career
At the youth level he played in the 2001 COSAFA U-17 Cup, scoring against South Africa in the final.

International goals 
Scores and results list Malawi's goal tally first.

Honours

International
Malawi U17
 COSAFA U-17 Cup: 2001

References

External links 
 
 

1986 births
Living people
Malawian footballers
Malawi international footballers
Malawi youth international footballers
2010 Africa Cup of Nations players
Expatriate soccer players in South Africa
Association football midfielders
Malawian expatriates in South Africa
Nyasa Big Bullets FC players
Black Leopards F.C. players
Platinum Stars F.C. players
South African Premier Division players